"Zimzalabim" is a song recorded by South Korean girl group Red Velvet for their sixth Korean extended play The ReVe Festival: Day 1, which acts as the first installment of the group's The ReVe Festival trilogy. Primarily an EDM-influenced electropop track that resembles a "colorful parade" and showcases an extravagant soundscape, the song was composed by production duo Caesar & Loui, Ollipop and Hayley Aitken with Korean lyrics adaptation by lyricist Lee Seu-ran, which tells the listeners to "unfold a dream" that is "held deeply" in their heart. Accompanied by an amusement park-themed music video, it was released on June 19, 2019 by SM Entertainment as the lead single for Day 1, and subsequently the first single from The ReVe Festival trilogy.

Upon its release, "Zimzalabim" polarized music critics over its "genre-hopping" composition. While some felt the song was a "downhill" from the group's previous experimenting tunes, others saw the song as a sonic roller coaster ride and praised its "energetic, anthemic" sound. It also attained moderate success, becoming their first lead single to miss the top ten on Gaon Digital Chart, peaking at number eleven, while earning Red Velvet their fourteenth consecutive top-ten entry on Billboards World Digital Songs chart. The song also marked the group's first chart appearance in Oceania, peaking at number thirty-nine on New Zealand Hot Singles Chart.

 Background and release 
Following the release of their second Japanese extended play Sappy on May, SM Entertainment shared the first preview of The ReVe Festival through social media accounts on June 4, 2019 The word "Zimzalabim" was revealed on June 8 to 9 through the videos posted on Red Velvet's official social media accounts. The group released a trailer video on June 10 which announced the full-scale start of The ReVe Festival through their YouTube and V Live channels. It was revealed that SM Entertainment chief producer Lee Soo-man has been holding the song for a while, but strongly suggested that the group was ready to pull the track off as a title song. The song had its official digital release on June 19, 2019, along with The ReVe Festival: Day 1.

Composition

"Zimzalabim" was composed by Olof Lindskog, Daniel Caesar, Ludwig Lindell and Hayley Aitken. In an email interview with The Korea Herald, Daniel Caesar and Ludwig Lindell under the name of Caesar & Loui revealed that the song was inspired by Girls' Generation's "I Got a Boy".

Musically, Tamar Herman of Billboard characterized "Zimzalabim" as an electropop song with "funky percussive melodies, tinny hip-hop chants, EDM dance breaks, and chill, groovy moments". It is composed in the key of F major, with a tempo of 128 beat-per-minute. Choi Young-joo of No Cut News noted the "rhythmic drumming and cool melodies". In addition, Lee Jung-ho of Star News noted the song's unconventional style and frequent changes in genre. Lyrically, "Zimzalabim" talks about "breaking convention, reaching for your dreams, and letting a little bit of magic back into your life".

Music video

 Background 

On June 10, 2019, the trailer video titled "Special Competition: RVF D-10", was uploaded through the Red Velvet's official YouTube channel. On June 17, 2019, a 17-second video teaser for "Zimzalabim" was uploaded on the official SM Town channel. A final 19-second video teaser was uploaded the next day, and the music video for "Zimzalabim" was released on June 19, 2019.

 Synopsis and reception 
The music video is set in a fantastical amusement park, where they ride roller coasters through the skies, throw a tea party in a spinning teacup and perform the song alongside sentient instruments. Following the music video's release, writer Tamar Herman of Billboard described it as "a bright music video", further praising the video for "the song's mesmerizing choreography". Writer Puah Ziwei of NME noted the "energetic" music video. Emlyn Travis of Buzzfeed noted the video as "magical" referring to its "carnival rides, floating instruments, tea cups, and a hefty dose of fantasy".

Live performances
Red Velvet promoted the song on several music programs in South Korea including Show! Music Core, Music Bank and Inkigayo. The group received five music show trophies for the song.

On June 22, 2019, Red Velvet has released methods of applying for the global dance cover campaign, "Zimzalabim In Public" through various official SNS accounts, as well as a focus cam by members with the highlight choreography of the new song, and the group dance shooting site. On June 25, 2019, a flash mob performance video, titled "ZIP.CODE : SEOUL" was uploaded to the SM Town official YouTube channel. About 500 people, including famous YouTube creators Na Ha-eun and Go Toe-kyung were part of the performance.

Commercial performance
"Zimzalabim" debuted at number 14 on the Gaon Digital Chart and peaked at number 11 the following week. The song debuted at number 8 on the Billboard K-pop Hot 100 before reaching number 4 in its second week. It was later ranked at number 169 on the year-end Gaon Digital Chart for 2019. It became the group's fourteenth consecutive top-ten single on the World Digital Song Sales chart, reaching number 10 three weeks after its release. Moreover, "Zimzalabim" reached the weekly chart in New Zealand, becoming their first entry on the latter chart.

 Critical reception 
Following its initial release, "Zimzalabim" was met with mixed reviews from music critics. Tamar Herman of Billboard magazine viewed the track as an "extravagant soundscape", adding it as a "genre-hopping song, which incorporates an addicting chorus". Writer Kim Do-hyun of IZM described the track as "neither a meaningful experiment nor a significant point in Red Velvet's career".

The music video was placed atop BuzzFeeds list of "Best K-pop Music Videos of 2019", where it claimed that the video showcased everything "from dancing crystalline animals to boots that march on their own", labelling it as "a perfect example of how Red Velvet boldly pushes creative boundaries with grace, style, and a sprinkle of magic."

Accolades
"Zimzalabim" received nominations for the 2019 Mnet Asian Music Awards and the 9th Gaon Chart Music Awards. The song managed to receive five music program wins. The song also achieved two consecutive Melon Weekly Popularity Awards. 

 Awards 

 Usage in media 
On January 15, 2020, Trolls World Tour used "Zimzalabim" in a trailer that was released by Thailand film distributor Major Group marking the appearance of Red Velvet in the film. On April 8, 2020 the film also used the song in the trailer released by South Korean Universal Pictures.

 Credits and personnel 
Credits adapted from the liner notes of The ReVe Festival: Day 1.Studio Recorded at SM Blue Cup Studio
 Digital edited and engineered for mix at SM LYVIN Studio
 Mixed at SM Blue Ocean StudioPersonnel'

 Red Velvet (Irene, Seulgi, Wendy, Joy, Yeri) – vocals, background vocals
 Lee Seu-ran – Korean lyrics
 Olof Lindskog – original writer, composition, arrangement
 Daniel Caesar – original writer, composition, arrangement
 Ludwig Lindell – original writer, composition, arrangement

 Hayley Aitken – original writer, composition, background vocals
 Kenzie – vocal director
 Jeong Eui-seok – recording
 Lee Ji-hong – digital editing, mixing engineer
 Kim Chul-soon – mixing

Charts

Weekly charts

Monthly charts

Year-end charts

Release history

See also 
 List of M Countdown Chart winners (2019)
List of Inkigayo Chart winners (2019)

References

2019 singles
2019 songs
Korean-language songs
Red Velvet (group) songs
SM Entertainment singles
Songs written by Hayley Aitken